Sumit Ganguly is a professor of political science at Indiana University and currently holds that University's Rabindranath Tagore Chair in Indian Cultures and Civilizations, focusing on comparative politics in South Asia.

Ganguly completed his undergraduate degree at Berea College in 1977, his master's degree from Miami University in 1978, and his Ph.D. in political science at the University of Illinois - Urbana-Champaign in 1984. Prior to being appointed at Indiana University, he taught at Michigan State University, Hunter College, Columbia University, and the University of Texas at Austin.

Ganguly was a founding editor of the journals India Review and Asian Security.

Published works
 Books
 The Crisis in Kashmir: Portents of War, Hopes of Peace, Cambridge University Press, 1999. 
 Conflict Unending: India–Pakistan Tensions since 1947, Columbia University Press, 2002. 
 The Kashmir Question: Retrospect and Prospect, Routledge, 2004. 
 Fearful Symmetry: India-Pakistan Crises in the Shadow of Nuclear Weapons (with Devin T. Hagerty), University of Washington, 2006. 
 Indian Foreign Policy, Oxford University Press, 2012. . Revised 2015: 
 Deadly Impasse: India–Pakistan Relations at the Dawn of a New Century, Cambridge University Press, 2016. 
 Ascending India and Its State Capacity: Extraction, Violence, and Legitimacy (with William R. Thompson), Yale University Press, 2017. 
 The Future of ISIS: Regional and International Implications (with Feisal al-Istrabadi), Brookings Institution Press, 2018. 
 Edited works
 India as an Emerging Power, Routledge, 2004. 
 US-Indian Strategic Cooperation into the 21st Century: More than Words (coedited with Andrew Scobell and Brian Shoup), Routledge, 2006. 
 South Asia, New York University Press, 2006. 
 India and Counterinsurgency: Lessons Learned, Routledge, 2009, 
 Asian Rivalries: Conflict, Escalation, and Limitations on Two-level Games (co-edited with William R. Thompson), Stanford University Press, 2011.

Awards
Ganguly was awarded the Pravasi Bharatiya Samman (Distinguished Overseas Indian) award by the President of India in 2009.

References

Academic journal editors
Indiana University faculty
Writers about the Kashmir conflict
Indian foreign policy writers
Scholars of Indian foreign policy
Recipients of Pravasi Bharatiya Samman